Bath University Boat Club is a rowing club on the River Avon, based at Newbridge, Bath, Somerset.

History
The club belongs to the University of Bath and share the facilities at the Minerva Bath Rowing Club.

The club has recorded wins at the Henley Women's Regatta and has produced two national championship crews.

Honours

National champions

References

Sport in Somerset
Clubs and societies in Somerset
Sport in Bath, Somerset
Rowing clubs in England
Rowing clubs of the River Avon